Ronald Mansbridge (11 November 1905 – 1 September 2006) was a publisher and writer. He served for forty years as the U.S. representative for Cambridge University Press. He had also served briefly as Acting Director of MIT University Press and, for two years, as a Managing Director of the UK office of Yale University Press.

Frederick Ronald Mansbridge was born in Sanderstead, Surrey, England, the fourth child of George Frederick Mansbridge, inventor of the Mansbridge electrical condenser, and Florence Quye Mansbridge. He traced his ancestry back to the Mansbridges whose land is shown on medieval maps of Hampshire as the Mansbridge Hundred.

He was educated at Malvern College (1919–25) and Corpus Christi College, Cambridge (1925–28). He went to the United States in 1928 and for two years taught in the English Department at Barnard College, working also at Oxford University Press. In 1930 he joined Cambridge University Press as its representative with the Macmillan Company in New York City.

On 10 April 1931, he married Georgia St Clair Mullan, daughter of George V. Mullan, Justice of the New York state supreme court, and Helen St Clair Mullan. They had two children: Jane Mansbridge, now Adams Professor at the John F. Kennedy School of Government at Harvard University, and Bruce Mansbridge. The Mansbridges moved from New York City to Weston, Connecticut, in 1947. In 1990, two years after the death of his first wife, Mansbridge married author Janet Dunning Van Duyn, who died in 2003.

In 1949 Mansbridge left Macmillan to establish the Cambridge University Press American Branch, beginning with a workforce of nine. On retirement, after more than forty years with Cambridge University Press, he served briefly as Acting Director of the MIT University Press, and then for two years as Managing Director of the Yale University Press, London Office.

Mansbridge's first printed contribution was a pacifist piece. He later wrote on books and Bibles, publishing and English usage for the Book Collector, Scholarly Publishing, Publishers Weekly, The Saturday Review of Literature, Verbatim and English Today. His collection of Cambridge University Press books printed between 1584 and 1800 is now housed in the collection of fine books at the Waseda University Library, Tokyo. He was a member of the American Institute of Graphic Arts (of which he was elected vice-president in 1940), the Century Association, the Grolier Club of New York City and The Baker Street Irregulars. He was also a member of the Tyndale Society. Mansbridge wrote bridge columns for several publications, the first in 1928 and the latest a weekly column entitled "Minuteman's Bridge", for the Westport Minuteman until 2002.

He had written a book of annotated limericks, and a book on bridge: How to Win at Bridge Without Being an Expert. He celebrated his 100th birthday on 11 November 2005. He died in Weston at 100 years on 1 September 2006.

Publications
 "Three centuries of Cambridge Bibles", as F. R. Mansbridge, Publishers Weekly
 Reprinted as 3-page end material in 300 Years of Printing the Authorised Version of the Holy Bible at Cambridge, 1629–1929 (Pensacola, FL: Vance Publ., 2006; Classic Reprints no. 115)  – a short book comprising primarily a booklet with the same title published "to commemorate the tercentenary of a. v. Bible printing at Cambridge" (Cambridge U. Press, 1929) 
 "Towards an ideal university press", Scholarly Publishing, 2 (1971), pp 219-27
 "J. P. Morgan & I: book collectors", The Book Collector 44:4 (1995)
 Reprinted as an 11-page book with the same title (Palm Springs, Brick Row, 2004) 
 How to Win at Bridge Without Being an Expert

References

 "Ronald Mansbridge: Cambridge University Press's representative in the US for 40 years and, at 100, its living archive". David McKitterick. The Independent. 7 September 2006. Retrieved 18 May 2010.
 "Ronald Mansbridge". Rome News-Tribune (story filed Weston, CT). 10 September 2006, p. 6A. Google (google.com/newspapers). Retrieved 18 May 2010.
 "Ronald Mansbridge". Westport News (Westport, CT). 6 September 2006. Retrieved 18 May 2010. 
 "Ronald Mansbridge, 100, Started Cambridge Press in United States". The New York Times. 8 September 2006. Retrieved 18 May 2010.

External links
  

1905 births
2006 deaths
Contract bridge writers
English centenarians
Men centenarians
English publishers (people)
Alumni of Corpus Christi College, Cambridge
People educated at Malvern College
People from Sanderstead
People from Weston, Connecticut
20th-century English businesspeople